The Wirraminna Environmental Education Centre is a public park, botanic gardens and learning centre located in Burrumbuttock, NSW Australia in the Riverina region. Established in 1995 on an old stock reserve, it is maintained by volunteers.

In 2005, the Discovery Centre was built in Wirraminna for use by schools and community groups. The Discovery Centre has aquaria displaying native fish from the Murray-Darling Basin and Southern Corroboree frogs.

Over 2000 primary school children visit Wirraminna annually, from schools throughout the region.

History 
Wirraminna was originally known as public watering place 443 (20 February 1904) and declared a town water supply on 27 August 1937 controlled by Hume Shire Council. Through the cooperation of local residents and the principal of Burrumbuttock School, Wirraminna was established in 1995. In 2005 Wirraminna received financial support from the Australian Government’s Regional Partnerships program, which with matching local support enabled the construction of a rammed earth building named the Discovery Centre. Over 2000 primary school children visit Wirraminna annually, from schools throughout the region. It also provides a popular outing for clubs and organisations in the district, and many locals and visitors to the region call in to explore the gardens and learn about our local environment. Extensive interpretative signage around the park tells the environment story.

Awards

Creative Catchment Kids books 
The Creative Catchment Kids program produces student written and illustrated books on different environmental themes.

Videos and Educational Materials

References 

Botanical gardens in New South Wales
Parks in New South Wales